Keep America Beautiful is a nonprofit organization founded in 1953. It is the largest community improvement organization in the United States, with more than 700 state and community-based affiliate organizations and more than 1,000 partner organizations.

Keep America Beautiful aims to end littering, to improve recycling, and to beautify American communities. The organization's narrow focus on littering and recycling has been criticized as greenwashing in that it diverts responsibility away from corporations and industries.

History
Keep America Beautiful was founded in December 1953 by a group of American corporations (including companies such as the American Can Company, the Continental Can Company, and Owens-Illinois Glass Co.), nonprofit organizations (the Izaak Walton League, National Council of State Garden Clubs, and the U.S. Brewers Foundation), government agencies (Connecticut State Highway Dept., N.Y. State Department of Public Works), and individuals in reaction to the growing problem of highway litter that followed the construction of the Interstate Highway System, and an increasingly mobile and convenience-oriented consumer culture. The original goal of the organization was to reduce litter through public education, including public service announcement (PSA) campaigns, and engage tri-sector partnerships through the support of industry, government and nonprofits.

Keep America Beautiful conducted many local PSA campaigns early in its history. One of these early campaigns in Pennsylvania (PennDOT) some attribute to having coined the term "litterbug," although the National Council of State Garden Clubs representative exhibited a "litter bug" emblem at the first Keep America Beautiful organizational meeting. Others report, however, that the term was coined by Paul B. Gioni, a copywriter in New York City who originated it for the Ad Council in 1947. Keep America Beautiful joined with the Ad Council in 1961 to popularize the idea that individuals must help protect against the effects litter has on the environment. Gioni came up with the 1963 television campaign theme "Every Litter Bit Hurts." Another campaign in 1964 featured the character Susan Spotless.

In 1970, Keep America Beautiful began distributing free brochures. More than 100,000 copies of the brochure were requested within four months.

In 1971, on Earth Day, a new campaign was launched with the theme "People Start Pollution. People Can Stop It." In what later became known as the "Crying Indian" PSA, the television ad, narrated by actor William Conrad with Peter Sarstedt's instrumental "Overture" playing in the background, featured Italian-American actor Iron Eyes Cody, who portrayed a Native American man devastated to see the destruction of Earth's natural beauty caused by the thoughtless pollution and litter of a modern society.

In 1976, Keep America Beautiful introduced its "Clean Community System", which encouraged local communities to prevent litter through education efforts, public service advertising, local research, the mapping of litter "hotspots", and cleanup activities. During the height of the campaign, it received over 2,000 letters a month from people wanting to join their local programs. The "Clean Community System" evolved into Keep America Beautiful's current network of roughly 600 state and community-based affiliates nationwide.

In 1999, Keep America Beautiful introduced an annual "Great American Cleanup" campaign. The national spring cleanup focuses on local efforts at beautification. Volunteers organize to remove litter and debris from roadsides, highways, shorelines and waterways; plant trees, flowers and community gardens; clean and restore nature trails, recreation areas and playgrounds; recycle aluminum cans, plastic bottles, electronics, paper products, scrap tires, and clothing; rebuild public spaces in communities struck by natural disasters; and much more.

In 2018, the 65th anniversary of Keep America Beautiful, the nonprofit advertised its new PSA, "Let's Talk About America", which has been aired more than 115,000 times and received more than 1 billion media impressions to date.

Accomplishments
Keep America Beautiful is best known for its "Crying Indian" public service advertisement (PSA) which launched on Earth Day in 1971 and for its annual America Recycles Day. The advertising campaign has been widely credited, including in Frank Lowenstein's "Voices of Protest", with inspiring America's fledgling environmental movement. 

Keep America Beautiful was the first organization to bring littering to national attention. It made "litterbug” a household word.

In 2018, the Great American Cleanup, the nation's largest community improvement program, celebrated its 20th year. Keep America Beautiful, along with network of affiliates and partner organizations, engaged volunteers across the country who logged 9.4 million volunteer hours in helping to clean public spaces; improve and beautify roads, shorelines and waterways; and plant trees, flowers, and gardens. In total, 24.7 million pounds of litter and 68 million pounds of recyclables were collected.

In 2021, Keep America Beautiful released a comprehensive litter study. Its study concluded that 90% of Americans agree litter is a problem in their community, roadside litter is down 54% in the last ten years and there are approximately 50 billion pieces of litter on the ground in the United States.  In concert with the study's release, Keep America Beautiful launched their hashtag #152AndYou on Earth Day representing that if all individuals picked up 152 pieces of litter, there would be no litter on the ground until someone littered again.

Programs

Cigarette Litter Prevention Program 
The Cigarette Litter Prevention Program (CLPP), created by Keep America Beautiful in 2002, is the nation's largest program aimed at eliminating cigarette litter. Since its inception, the program has been implemented in more than 1,700 communities nationwide. Throughout its history, the CLPP has helped reduce cigarette litter in the communities in which it has been implemented by an average of 50 percent. Recognizing the presence of ash receptacles correlates with lower rates of cigarette butt littering, Keep America Beautiful has placed 10,000 litter stands in public settings through 2019.

Community Restoration and Resiliency Fund 
The Keep America Beautiful Community Restoration and Resiliency Fund (CRRF) was launched in 2017 after Hurricane Harvey's historic flooding in Texas and Louisiana and prior to Hurricane Irma coming ashore in Florida. Managed and administered by Keep America Beautiful, the fund provides long-term support in the form of grants to rebuild public spaces, such as parks, greenways, community gateways, main streets, downtown areas, and open spaces.

Plogging 
Plogging, the act of picking up litter while jogging, debuted in Sweden in 2016 and was adopted by Keep America Beautiful in 2018 as it incorporates reducing litter, improving recycling, and beautifying communities – the three primary areas of work that Keep America Beautiful and its network of affiliates focus on. In 2019, Keep America Beautiful hosted its inaugural Trash Dash, a 5K plogging event in Connecticut, which resulted in the collection of more than 700 pounds of litter and recyclables.

Youth and education
Waste in Place is the Keep America Beautiful educational resource developed for prekindergarten through 12th grade students and educators. KAB Schools is a youth initiative offering schools educational programs. There are three learning service-learning projects, including a Waste Audit, Litter Free Places, and Trashless Tree Trails.

Partnership with other organizations
Keep America Beautiful distributes programming and materials through a network of organizations. In addition to KAB's certified affiliates, the organization partners with other groups to expand its reach. These include multiple state recycling organizations, Boys & Girls Clubs of America, Hands on Network and the Points of Light Institute, the Arbor Day Foundation, Pennsylvania Horticultural Society, National CleanUp Day, Ocean Conservancy, Sustainable Urban Forests Coalition, EARTHDAY.ORG, and Take Pride in America, among others.

Scouting Keep America Beautiful Day was first cosponsored by Keep America Beautiful and the Boy Scouts of America in 1971 as a national cleanup and recycling program. Keep America Beautiful also co-sponsors the "Keep America Beautiful Hometown USA Award" with the Boy Scouts of America that boy scouts can earn by completing a non-paid, community service project, with the approved scout project being designed to "help keep America beautiful and benefit the community either physically or financially."

Controversies

Keep America Beautiful's actions have been criticized as greenwashing. The organization's narrow focus on littering and recycling diverts responsibility away from corporations and industries.

Despite self-identifying as having Native American ancestry with the stage name of Iron Eyes Cody, Espera Oscar DeCorti was of Italian descent. This sparked accusations of cultural appropriation and racial stereotyping. In February 2023, the Keep America Beautiful organization transferred ownership of the ad's copyright to the National Congress of American Indians, who intend to restrict use of the ad to only historical purposes.

Heather Rogers, creator of the 2005 documentary film Gone Tomorrow. The Hidden Life of Garbage and book of the same name, classifies Keep America Beautiful as one of the first greenwashing corporate fronts. She asserts that the group was created in response to Vermont's 1953 attempt to legislate a mandatory deposit to be paid at point of purchase on disposable beverage containers and banning the sale of beer in non-refillable bottles.

Keep America Beautiful's narrow focus on litter, and its characterization of litter as a consumer created problem, is seen as an attempt to divert an extended producer responsibility from the industries that manufacture and sell disposable products to consumers who improperly dispose of the non-returnable wrappers, filters, and beverage containers.

Elizabeth Royte, author of Garbage Land, describes Keep America Beautiful as a "masterful example of corporate greenwash", writing that in contrast to its anti-litter campaigns, it ignores the potential of recycling legislation and resists changes to packaging.

The tobacco industry developed programs with Keep America Beautiful that focused on cigarette litter solutions acceptable to the industry such as volunteer clean-ups and ashtrays, in lieu of smoking bans at parks and beaches. The tobacco industry has funded Keep America Beautiful and similar organizations internationally.

In popular culture
The "Crying Indian" ad has been parodied on Married... with Children, Wayne's World 2, The Simpsons episode "Trash of the Titans", the Futurama episode "Where the Buggalo Roam", the Farrelly brothers movie Kingpin, the South Park episode "Go Fund Yourself", The League episode "Yobogoya," the Harvey Birdman, Attorney at Law episode "Back to the Present," and the Unbreakable Kimmy Schmidt episode "Kimmy Finds Her Mom!". The ad was also parodied in an E-Trade commercial that aired during Super Bowl XXXV in 2001.

Lassie was featured and recruited in helping to Keep America Beautiful by Lady Bird Johnson as the Nation's Mascot and War Against Litter in the beautification campaign. Lassie is in a poster with a forest ranger and the caption reads: "Help Lassie Keep America Beautiful".

See also
 Clean Up Australia
 Container deposit legislation
 Keep Britain Tidy
 Keep Northern Ireland Beautiful
 Litter in the United States
 National Cleanup Day
 Recycling in the United States
 Roads Beautifying Association (in the UK)

References

External links
 Official website

Public service announcements of the United States
Organizations established in 1953
Waste organizations
Companies based in Stamford, Connecticut
Litter
Environment of the United States
1953 establishments in New York (state)
Organizations based in Stamford, Connecticut
Non-profit organizations based in Connecticut
1950s neologisms
American advertising slogans
Recycling organizations